The 1950 Duke Blue Devils football team represented the Duke Blue Devils of Duke University during the 1950 college football season.

Schedule

References

Duke
Duke Blue Devils football seasons
Duke Blue Devils football